Demi de Jong (born 11 February 1995) is a Dutch former road cyclist. As a junior, de Jong won the bronze medal in the women's junior time trial at the 2012 UCI Road World Championships. In her last season she rode for UCI Women's Continental Team , but ended her career due to a knee injury. She is the younger sister of the 2016 Cyclo-cross World Champion, Thalita de Jong.

Major results

2012
 2nd Time trial, National Junior Road Championships
 3rd  Time trial, UCI Junior Road World Championships
2013
 2nd Time trial, National Junior Road Championships
 4th Overall Junior Energiewacht Tour
1st Stage 2
 6th Time trial, UCI Junior Road World Championships
2015
 National Road Championships
1st  Under-23 road race
5th Road race
 6th Road race, UEC European Under-23 Road Championships
 8th Gooik–Geraardsbergen–Gooik
2016
 5th Le Samyn des Dames
 5th Trofee Maarten Wynants
 6th Erondegemse Pijl
2017
 1st  Young rider classification Holland Ladies Tour
 3rd 7-Dorpenomloop Aalburg
 10th Gooik–Geraardsbergen–Gooik
2018
 5th Gooik–Geraardsbergen–Gooik
2019
 3rd Le Samyn des Dames

See also
2014 Boels–Dolmans season
2015 Boels–Dolmans season

References

External links
 
 

1995 births
Living people
Dutch female cyclists
UCI Road World Championships cyclists for the Netherlands
People from Woensdrecht
Cyclists from North Brabant
21st-century Dutch women